V. T. Nathan (3 November 1937 - 4 February 2017) JMN, KMN, FRSPL, was a Malaysian lawyer and philatelist.

Early life
V. T. Nathan was born in Serembanon on 3 November 1937 in Negeri Sembilan.

Career

Nathan practised as a lawyer.

Philately
Nathan was a specialist in the stamps and postal history of the Straits Settlements. In 1995 his collection won a gold medal at the stamp exhibition in Singapore and at the FIAP International Malpex exhibition in 1997 he won a large gold medal and a National Grand Prix award. In 2000 he won a large gold medal at Indepex and the Grand Prix International. 

He was the president of the Philatelic Society of Malaysia.

Death
Nathan died on 4 February 2017.

References 

1937 births
2017 deaths
20th-century Malaysian lawyers
Fellows of the Royal Philatelic Society London
Malaysian philatelists
People from Negeri Sembilan
Philately of Malaysia